Wetherby Bridge is a scheduled monument and Grade II-listed bridge over the River Wharfe in Wetherby, West Yorkshire, dating from the 13th century. The bridge connects Micklethwaite on the south bank to the town centre on the north. It formerly carried the A1 Great North Road but now carries the A661 Boston Road leading to Boston Spa and the south.

History

The bridge has 13th-century origins. It was rebuilt  in the 17th century and widened twice, first in 1773 and in 1826 to a design by Bernard Hartley.  Its repair has been a contentious political issue in the past.

In 1315 Eleanor de Percy petitioned Edward II for pontage for the bridge that she had undertaken to repair for redemption of the soul.  An inquisition in York declared that 'nobody' was bound to repair the bridge and in 1316 Eleanor was granted pontage.  In 1599 a stone mason complained at quarter session that he was owed £4 13s 4d for its repair.  The court ordered that £5 should be levied to pay him.  In 1614 at the Knaresborough quarter sessions it was reported that the bridge's pavement had decayed, the court issued a levy of twenty marks to be collected from the Wapentakes of Barkston, Claro and Skyrack to repair the bridge.  In 1662 the bridge was described as being 'hazardous to passengers and cattle'; repairs were estimated to cost £260 which was paid from county rates and two Wetherby residents were appointed as surveyors.  Issues regarding the bridge were raised at the quarter sessions ten times over the following fifty years and £300 was expended on its maintenance.  The bridge was an important logistical link for the coalfields of Garforth and Kippax to the south of the town and settlements north of the Wharfe.  Coal wagons caused the road surface to deteriorate while the fast rising nature of the Wharfe exacerbated structural problems.

Turner
J. M. W. Turner visited Wetherby in 1816 and painted the bridge.  The vantage point he used is no longer usable owing to tree growth.

Other river crossings in Wetherby
Until the first Wetherby by-pass was built and its new bridge was opened by the Minister for Transport Ernest Marples in the late 1950s, Wetherby Bridge was the only crossing in the area. The next upstream bridge was at Linton and downstream at Boston Spa.  The opening of the first by-pass bridge took the Great North Road away from the town.  Wetherby Bridge is now one of three road crossings along with the first and second bypass bridges (opened in the late 1980s). Three bridges are usable by pedestrians; the Ings footbridge (built in the early 1970s), Wetherby Bridge and the first bypass bridge (the second one is inaccessible because of motorway regulations).  Several bus routes cross the bridge.

Flooding
Wetherby Bridge is around a hundred yards downstream from Wetherby Weir.  When the Wharfe rises the adjacent car park and low-lying land at the Wilderness flood.  The bridge's arches can act as a barrier collecting debris and driftwood that can cause problems after the river level subsides.

War memorial
The town's war memorial designed by E. F. Roslyn is on the bridge.  On the morning of Remembrance Sunday the bridge is closed to traffic for the wreath laying ceremony.

Gallery

See also
 History of Wetherby
 List of crossings of the River Wharfe
 Listed buildings in Wetherby

References

External links

 Welcome to Yorkshire, Turner Trails, Wetherby Bridge

Listed buildings in Wetherby
River Wharfe
Scheduled monuments in West Yorkshire
Bridges in West Yorkshire
Grade II listed buildings in West Yorkshire
Grade II listed bridges